Felix Tschudin (born 19 May 1952) is a retired Swiss footballer who played for FC Basel and SC Binningen. He later played for SC Regio Basel in the 1980s and ended his active football by local club FC Münchenstein. Tschudin played as a defender.

Tschudin played all his youth football for FC Basel. He joined their first team in 1973 and played his domestic league debut in the away game at the Charmilles Stadium, in Geneva, on 11 November 1973 as Basel won 3–2 against Servette. In this game he received a booking for a foul on former youth team mate Rolf Riner.

In Basel's 1973–74 season Tschudin played a total of 14 games for the club scoring one goal. Six of these games were in the Nationalliga A and eight were friendly games. He scored his only goal for his club on 23 February 1974 in the friendly game at home in the Landhof against Grenchen. It was the fourth goal of the game as Basel won 6–2.

Following his season by FC Basel, Tschudin moved on to SC Binningen. He played for Binningen for four seasons (third tier of Swiss football). But because of differences, the Swiss Football Association banned Tschudin from playing for a complete season. He thus ended his playing career with several seasons for SC Regio Basel in the early 1980s, before joining local club FC Münchenstein.

References

Sources
 Rotblau: Jahrbuch Saison 2017/2018. Publisher: FC Basel Marketing AG. 
 Die ersten 125 Jahre. Publisher: Josef Zindel im Friedrich Reinhardt Verlag, Basel. 
 Verein "Basler Fussballarchiv" Homepage

FC Basel players
SC Binningen players
Swiss men's footballers
Association football defenders
1952 births
Living people
Footballers from Basel